The Luxembourgish National Cyclo-cross Championships are held annually to decide the Luxembourgish cycling champions in the cyclo-cross discipline, across various categories.

Men

Elite

Under-23
 1999 : Kim Kirchen
 2000 : Steve Fogen 
 2001 : Gusty Bausch
 2002 : Gusty Bausch
 2003 : Marc Ernster
 2004 : Marc Ernster
 2005 : Jempy Drucker
 2006 : Jempy Drucker
 2007 : Jempy Drucker
 2008 : David Claerebout
 2010 : Pit Schlechter
 2011 : Pit Schlechter
 2014 : Massimo Morabito
 2017 : Luc Turchi
 2018 : Félix Schreiber
 2019 : Nicolas Kess
 2020 : Loïc Bettendorff
 2022 : Loïc Bettendorff

Junior
 1996 : Max Becker
 1997 : Steve Fogen
 1998 : Gusty Bausch
 1999 : Marc Bastian
 2000 : Marc Ernster
 2001 : Marc Ernster
 2002 : Andy Schleck
 2003 : Jempy Drucker 
 2004 : Jempy Drucker
 2005 : Kim Michely
 2006 : David Schloesser
 2007 : Tom Thill
 2008 : Vincent Dias dos Santos
 2009 : Bob Jungels
 2010 : Bob Jungels
 2011 : Tom Schwarmes
 2012 : Sven Fritsch
 2013 : Ken Mueller
 2014 : Ken Mueller
 2015 : Kevin Geniets
 2016 : Michel Ries
 2017 : Tristan Parrotta
 2018 : Nicolas Kess
 2019 : Loïc Bettendorff
 2020 : Mats Wenzel
 2022 : Mathieu Kockelmann

Women

Elite

See also
Luxembourgish National Road Race Championships
Luxembourgish National Time Trial Championships

References

Cycle races in Luxembourg
Recurring sporting events established in 1920
1920 establishments in Luxembourg
National cyclo-cross championships